Mount Druitt is a suburb of Sydney.

Mount Druitt may also refer to:
Electoral district of Mount Druitt, New South Wales state electoral district
Mount Druitt railway station, a train station in Mount Druitt
Mount Druitt Hospital, a hospital in Mount Druitt
Mount Druitt Aerodrome, a Royal Australian Air Force landing ground
Mount Druitt Waterworks, a theme park in Mount Druitt